Men's Slalom World Cup 1978/1979

Final point standings

In Men's Slalom World Cup 1978/79 the best 5 results count. Seven racers had a point deduction, which are given in brackets. Ingemar Stenmark won his fifth Slalom World Cup in a row.

References
 fis-ski.com

World Cup
FIS Alpine Ski World Cup slalom men's discipline titles